Kerim Avci (born 16 December 1989) is a Turkish-German footballer who plays as a midfielder for Bandırmaspor.

External links

1989 births
Footballers from Dortmund
German people of Turkish descent
Living people
Turkish footballers
German footballers
Association football midfielders
Rot-Weiss Essen players
Kayseri Erciyesspor footballers
Altınordu F.K. players
Balıkesirspor footballers
Sivasspor footballers
Gaziantep F.K. footballers
Altay S.K. footballers
Adana Demirspor footballers
Gençlerbirliği S.K. footballers
Bandırmaspor footballers
Regionalliga players
Süper Lig players
TFF First League players